Thomas Wykes may refer to:

 Thomas Wykes (chronicler) (1222–1291/93), English chronicler
 Thomas Wykes (MP for Leominster) (fl. 1554), MP for Leominster
 Thomas Wykes (MP for Cambridgeshire) (died c. 1430), MP for Cambridgeshire